Bakmil is a Baku Metro station. It was opened on 28 March 1979 and completely refurbished in 2018, reopening on March 26, 2019. The station forms a single-stop branch line that splits off from Nariman Narimanov metro station. Until 1993 it was known as Elektrozavod or, in Russian pre-1991, as Electrozavodskaya.

References

Baku Metro stations
Railway stations opened in 1979
1979 establishments in Azerbaijan
Azerbaijan–Italy relations